The Dale Baronetcy, of West Lodge in the parish of Holy Trinity, Darlington, in the County of Durham, was a title in the Baronetage of the United Kingdom. It was created on 13 July 1895 for the industrialist David Dale. He was the grandson of the Scottish merchant and businessman David Dale. The title became extinct on the death of the second Baronet in 1932.

Dale baronets, of West Lodge  (1895)
Sir David Dale, 1st Baronet (1829–1906)
Sir James Backhouse Dale, 2nd Baronet (1855–1932)

References

External links
Portrait of Sir David Dale, 1st Baronet
Photograph of Sir David Dale, 1st Baronet

Extinct baronetcies in the Baronetage of the United Kingdom